The 1944 United States Senate election in Iowa took place on November 7, 1944. Incumbent Democratic Senator Guy M. Gillette ran for a second full term in office but was defeated by Republican Governor Bourke B. Hickenlooper.

Primary elections were held on June 5.

Gillette would be elected to Iowa's other Senate seat four years later and the two men would serve together as colleagues from 1949 to 1955.

Democratic primary

Candidates
Guy M. Gillette, incumbent Senator since 1936
Ernest J. Seemann, perennial candidate

Results

General election

Candidates
Bourke B. Hickenlooper, Governor of Iowa (Republican)
W.S. Bowden (Prohibition)
Guy M. Gillette, incumbent Senator since 1936 (Democratic)
C.W. Drescher (Socialist}

Results

See also 
 1944 United States Senate elections

References 

1944
Iowa
United States Senate